As a result of incumbent U.S. President Barack Obama's re-election victory over Mitt Romney  reaction emanated from across the world including states and other institutions. Several U.S. embassies around the world held mock elections and hosted parties in watching the final result trickle through. Obama made his first foreign trip after the election day success at the end of November when he visited Cambodia for the 2012 ASEAN summit amidst his foreign policy outlook shift to East Asia. On the same trip, he became the first ever U.S. president to visit Myanmar. Global popular sentiment was generally in favor of Obama with the exception of Chile, Pakistan and, speculatively, Iran. Financial markets responded with mixed reactions to the result while the international news media reacted to specific issues surrounding the election.

States
 – President Hamid Karzai reacted to the victory from abroad, saying that he hoped relations will strengthen "on the basis of mutual interests of the two countries."
The Truth and Justice party's deputy leader Asadullah Walwaji said: "The Obama administration has experience from Afghanistan and the region – it can be effective for Afghanistan's situation."
National Coalition leader Dr Abdullah Abdullah said that the United States' role in the country could be fruitful. "There would not be hopes of a better situation in Afghanistan if there is not some basic changes inside Afghanistan after 2014 and if foreign policies return to the way they were in the past."
National Front of Afghanistan leader Ahmad Zia Masood called on Obama to help clean the politics of Afghanistan from corruption prior to the 2014 election or risk another Afghan civil war and a potential return of the Taliban. "On top of all these problems if the election is rigged then the people will loose patience and that opens up the door for a massive civil war. If the political process is transparent here there won't be a reason for a civil war. We expect Obama to pressure the government for a free and fair election."
The Taliban called on Obama to immediately withdraw its ISAF forces. Spokesman Zabiullah Mujahid issued a statement that read "[use this] golden opportunity [to solve the problems of the U.S. instead of] attacking and invading [other countries]." He added that the people of the U.S. had grown weary of the war as futile and a waste of money.
 The Islamic Emirate of Afghanistan issued a statement that called on Obama to do five things: Obama should use a second chance to avoid the U.S. acting as world police and focus on its own population instead of "burning [from] the flames of international hatred; that the people of the U.S. are weary of wars and military spending and Obama should hence end the "futile" Afghan war and "tarnishing" the U.S. name; in the same vein, Obama should realize the populace is tired of the physical and economic cost of the war and should hence "immediately withdrawing its invading troops;" that the government of Afghanistan which the U.S. back "in our country are the most detested figures and rejected faces" and thus the U.S. would "only face more difficulties and will gain only more human and material losses; and lastly that Obama has realized the U.S. has "lost the battle in Afghanistan therefore instead of prolonging and lying, it should immediately leave our pure soil and instead turn its attention towards its own country and people.
The people of Afghanistan were more weary about a non-commitment to the country from the U.S. Others were, however, ambivalent to the election.
The U.S. embassy held a ceremony marking the result. U.S. Ambassador James B. Cunningham spoke of the tasks ahead for Obama, including the completion of the U.S. combat mission, a continued presence of some U.S. troops after the 2014 withdrawal deadline and implementing the Kabul–Washington strategic pact.

 – President Bujar Nishani and Prime Minister Sali Berisha congratulated Obama on his re-election.

 – President Cristina Fernandez de Kirchner also congratulated Obama and called on him to "assume the role of global leader to overcome this political and economic crisis."

 – President Serzh Sargsyan issued a congratulatory message to Obama the day following his re-election.
U.S. Ambassador John Heffern said that Obama would be more involved in working to resolve the Nagorno-Karabakh conflict along with Russia and France, during his second term. He added that Obama would "try to do his best to provide more investments from the U.S. and larger trade volumes."

 – Prime Minister Julia Gillard congratulated Obama on his victory by commenting on the close relations and work undertaken by their two states and stating she "look[ed] forward to continuing this friendship." Leader of the Opposition Tony Abbott also offered his congratulations to Obama and the newly elected members of Congress and governors saying that the U.S.–Australia alliance continued to enjoy bipartisan support in both countries.

 – Prime Minister Elio Di Rupo congratulated Obama, saying: "His re-election is an encouraging signal for the future of the United States, the whole world and also our future. Americans have made a choice in favour of a more just and tolerant America. He always chose a multilateral approach based on mutual respect, consultation and co-operation. American citizens are [also] showing the merits of a series of fundamental reforms in favour of greater justice and social protection [in regard to Obamacare]. [We hope for] a continuation of the fruitful co-operation with the president and his government in the interests of both countries and all their people."
Foreign Minister Didier Reynders, who visited the U.S. embassy at 7:00 as the result was coming on 7 November, hoped Obama would visit the country not just for EU issues but also a bilateral visit. He also predicted Obama would take more risks in his second term: "We expect initiatives in the Middle East. Maybe he will now be able to take stronger action against Syria." Defence Minister Pieter De Crem also echoed the sentiments over the Middle East: "US Middle East policy will centre on how to deal with Israel, how to deal with the gigantic tensions between Israel and Iran and the threat to security posed by Iran. I believe that a hard stand will have to be taken."
Minister-President of Flanders Kris Peeters said the continuation of the Obama administration was a positive development: "It's extremely important for Europe and Flanders in which ways Mr Obama will stimulate the American economy. A great worry that the president must address is the budget deficit. For all kinds of matters it's a good thing that the president is again getting a term to give his policies shape. I hope he will succeed." He also wrote on Twitter: "Congratulations Barack Obama. Four more years to push America forward."

 – Vice Minister of Social Movement Coordination Cesar Navarro said before the election that regardless of whoever wins "the US won't modify its imperialist policy toward Latin America and its ambition to...dominate the developing countries."
Similarly, opposition congressman Osney Martinez said a second-term Obama administration would not change its stance in relations with the region if the region maintains an anti-imperialism stance.

 – Prime Minister Stephen Harper issued an official statement that read: "On behalf of the Government of Canada, I would like to congratulate President Barack Obama on his victory in tonight's election and on being re-elected by the American people for a second term. ... Over the last four years, the President and I have worked on several important bilateral initiatives to generate jobs and growth in both our countries. ... I look forward to working with the Obama Administration over the next four years to continue finding ways to increase trade and investment flows between our countries. ... I also look forward to continuing to work with President Obama on pressing global economic issues as well as on security challenges, such as those in Iran and Syria. I would also like to congratulate all incoming and re-elected Members of Congress and Governors. Close cooperation between our two countries will be essential as we seek to create jobs, growth and long-term prosperity over the coming months and years."

 – Chinese President Hu Jintao wrote a telegram to Obama in which he lauded the "positive progress" in bilateral relations. He added: "You and I have common views on constructing a China-US cooperation partnership based on mutual respect, mutual benefit and a win-win situation and constructing a new model for relations between great powers." The Foreign Ministry said that both Hu and Premier Wen Jiabao telephoned Obama to congratulate him.
 – Chief Executive Leung Chun-ying wrote to Obama expressing his congratulations and inviting Obama to visit Hong Kong during his second term to "see first-hand why Hong Kong holds such great attraction for U.S. business interests in Asia."
 – One of the first congratulatory calls to Obama came from the Dalai Lama who said that he recalled how the previous election had "inspired the world with a call to take responsibility for the problems we face as global citizens. Since then, you have made earnest efforts to live up to that great hope and trust placed in you by the American public. I believe you have been re-elected now in recognition of that effort."

 – First Lady Cecilia Morel congratulated the Obama family and said "I can do nothing more than express great happiness and extend a congratulatory embrace to our dear friends Barack and Michelle Obama."
Carolina Tohá, who had been elected mayor of Santiago less than two weeks prior, wrote on Twitter of her relief, a "new hope" in Obama's re-election and that the world would be worse off with a different result.

 – Prime Minister Zoran Milanovic said the next day that he was pleased with the result and that though Romney was competent the result was a close race. He added that he did not expect changes in relations between the two countries and that "great interest prevails for American elections as they impact not only America but the world too." Foreign and European Affairs Minister Vesna Pusic told a press conference that the electoral process was exciting and that the result was assurance of a continuity in the political orientation toward Croatia, which she said was significant and positive. "In a way we remain to be a partner to the US in the region and for us that is an important role." The public relations office later said that Milanovic sent a letter of congratulations on behalf of both Croatia and the Croatian people, in which he thanked Obama and his administration for its efforts in working towards Croatia's successful integration into the Euro-Atlantic institutions.

 – President Juan Manuel Santos congratulated his counterpart Obama hours after the result, stating that "we hope to continue working in the same way as we have been for the past two years: coordinated, with the same purpose, with the same goals, and with the same results," adding that the "triumph of President Barack Obama is good news for us because it allows us to continue consolidating a relationship that already has a strong foundation." He also noted the harmonic relation between the two countries.

 – Chancellor Carlos Roverssi told the local media that the result would not lead to much change for the country, with the possible exception of remittances to the country from its expatriates.
Some U.S. expatriates in the country supported an Obama win.

 The BBC reported little enthusiasm for the election, but most people thought Obama was the lesser of two evils vis-a-vis Romney.

 – Prime Minister Helle Thorning-Schmidt called Obama "an inspiring person with clear visions for the future" and wrote on Facebook: "I want to congratulate President Obama on his re-election. I look forward to continuing our close partnership. Particularly in times of crisis, we need visionary leaders who create social improvements, hold communities together and secure jobs and opportunities for many." Economy Minister Margrethe Vestager wrote on Twitter that she was "happy and relieved" at the result and she wished to "thank the American people".
Environment Minister Ida Auken also congratulated Obama via Twitter.
Former Prime Minister Lars Løkke Rasmussen also wrote on social media: "Huge congratulations to Barack Obama on his re-election. I have met and know Obama as a sincere, confident and dynamic leader with an eye for global challenge – both in regard to security policies and the economy. The world needs a strong and visible USA, and therefore I am personally happy that Barack Obama was re-elected. [Obama's strengthened mandate will allow him to] engage in global issues" and create optimism and growth, which is "fundamental for establishing new jobs: American, European and Danish." Rasmussen's fellow Venstre MP Søren Pind wrote on Facebook: "I would have voted for Romney. [Obama] has done rotten. But the symbol that he has become will carry him through. Personally, I am tired of symbolic politics. The US needs to get control of its economy. It will not happen with him."

 – Prime Minister Roosevelt Skerrit lauded the relationship between the two countries, as well as his personal relationship with Obama. He added that he was "very pleased with the outcome of the election [and that] we have always enjoyed a close relationship with the United States of America and President Obama is a true friend. I have discussed our development plans with him on several occasions and he has always been cordial and attentive. US foreign policy is increasingly focused on anti-terrorism activities and dealing with global hot-spots rather than developmental issues, particularly those of the Caribbean and Latin American, hopefully this will improve going forward." A customary official congratulatory message was sent to Obama on behalf of the government and the people.

 – Prior to the election, President Rafael Correa wished Obama luck saying: "[I do not want to] interfere in the internal matters of other countries. [But] I wish the best of luck to President Obama. I am personally fond of President Obama, I think he is a great person." Republican administrations, he added, "have always had a much more unfamiliar, a much more simplistic and primitive foreign policy toward Latin America."

 – President Mohamed Morsi's spokesman Yasser Ali stated: "We congratulate the American people on their choice and we hope the newly elected US administration will work to achieve the interests of both the American and Egyptian people." He also said an official congratulatory note would be sent to Obama. The Muslim Brotherhood's Ali Abdel Fatah said: "We don't care who wins, Obama or Romney. They have the same principles but with different methods. Their attitude towards the security of Israel to the detriment of Palestinians is the same. What we want is to reinforce our sovereignty. We do not want outside interference in our internal affairs, and we do not want the US to be Egypt's obligatory ally."
Former Ambassador to the U.S. Nabil Fahmy told Al-Ahram: "Mitt Romney makes you think of an ambiguous, contradictory foreign policy. At the same time, the Arab world is disappointed in Obama and won't be optimistic if he is re-elected"; he also said that the Gulf Arab states were disappointed in Obama for not supporting their ally in Hosni Mubarak.

 – President Francois Hollande sent his congratulations to Obama: "Your re-election is a clear choice in favor of an America that is open, unified, completely engaged in the international scene and conscious of the challenges facing our planet: peace, the economy and the environment." He had also prior to the election said that he was inclined to favor Obama. In his letter to Obama, Hollande wrote "Cher Barack," however his English was criticised for having too many grammatical flaws.

 – Facing an election of her own, Chancellor Angela Merkel's office released a letter she wrote to Obama that read: "I have deeply appreciated our many meetings and conversations about all the issues involved in developing the German–American and the transatlantic relationship, not least in overcoming the global financial and economic crisis. I look forward to continuing all this cooperation so both our countries can continue to stand side-by-side to contend with the important foreign policy and economic challenges that we face as friends and allies. I wish you continued strength and success in the second term before you."

 – President Donald Ramotar said of the result that it was a "hard fought and well deserved victory." Prime Minister Sam Hinds added that the country was looking forward to continuing a good relationship.

 – In a telegram, Pope Benedict XVI assured Obama of his prayers and expressed the hope that "the ideals of freedom and justice that has guided the founding fathers of the United States of America continue to shine forth as the nation progresses." The Press Office Director Father Federico Lombardi stated that he hoped Obama will "respond to his citizen's expectations, serving law and justice [...] and respecting essential human and spiritual values while promoting a culture of life and religious freedom."

 – Deputy Prime Minister Tibor Navracsics hoped for a U.S. foreign policy shift towards Hungary and the region, particularly in light of Russia's growing influence. "I think the Central European nations now somehow vanished in the eyes of the American foreign policy. The American foreign policy think tanks and analysts think that Central Europe is in a safe and dry place and it is not in danger of a possible Russian influence. We sometimes think differently."
The Hungarian Air Force Band played U.S. classic songs as Hungarians, U.S. and citizens gathered in Budapest for "Europe's largest election-night event." About 1,500 invitees also gathered into a ballroom and other adjacent areas which were adorned with balloons, life-size portraits of both candidates and a replica of the White House's Oval Office in the Corinthia Hotel Budapest.

 – President Ólafur Ragnar Grímsson sent Obama greetings from himself, his wife and Iceland the day after the election. In an interview with Stöð 2 he said that in regard to cooperation with Iceland in matters of the Arctic and renewable energy: "It is [now] more likely that Obama will be a greater ally and collaborator."
Prime Minister Jóhanna Sigurðardóttir sent a letter of congratulations to Obama after the result.

 – Prime Minister Manmohan Singh congratulated Obama in a message he sent that read: "Your mandate gives you a historic opportunity to continue to work for the welfare of the American people as also for global peace and progress at an admittedly difficult juncture, not just for the U.S., but indeed for the world at large."

In the morning that the result trickled in, at Obama's old school in Jakarta's Menteng 01 Primary School students marched a poster of Obama through classrooms.

 – President Mahmoud Ahmadinejad, speaking from Bali, said the election was a "battleground for capitalists" and mocked the campaign finance during the electoral process. Vice President Mohammad Reza Rahimi told a research and scientific exhibition at Tehran University: "We will break grasping hands of Obama and we will be successful in bypassing the sanctions." Head of the Judicial system of Iran Sadeq Larijani said Obama "should not expect Iran to come to negotiating table," in response to rumors of bilateral discussions between the two countries.

 – President Michael D. Higgins conveyed congratulations from Ireland. He wrote to Obama: "The international community faces many daunting challenges and we look forward to your continued leadership and constructive engagement in the period ahead. The very close and warm relationship between Ireland and the United States has, with your help and encouragement, prospered during your tenure."
Tánaiste and Foreign Affairs Minister Eamon Gilmore told RTÉ Radio 1's Morning Ireland of immigration reform in the U.S. "Although that was mentioned in his first term, it didn't materialise at all. I think that is because there is a recognition in the US administration that investment is a two-way street."
Fianna Fáil Senator Mark Daly said of the election that it had "made members within the Republican Party reconsider their stance towards undocumented workers. Hopefully a compromise can be reached to finally offer an amnesty for the 50,000 Irish in America who are undocumented."
Newry and Mourne Sinn Féin Councillor Pat McGinn echoed the sentiment. "The President himself has recognized that the immigration system is broken and needs fixed. For the majority of people caught up in the nightmare of being classed as an illegal immigrant, there is currently no legal way to apply to become a resident/citizen of the United States. In his election victory speech he highlighted immigration as one of the issues he would address. I along with all those who are working to highlight and address the plight of the undocumented Irish living in the USA, am committed to make sure that this is the last generation of Irish in America that has to listen to a family member's funeral on the telephone. It is our goal that this is the last generation of Irish to be undocumented in America."

 – President Shimon Peres, speaking from Moscow's Russian Academy of Science where he was made an Honorary Professor, indicated congratulations and certainty that Obama will cooperate over peaceful resolution to conflicts with Iran.

We have all followed the elections in the United States. What happens in Russia and the US affects the entire world. I met President Obama and I highly appreciate him. He is an extraordinary person who represents the future, cares for the welfare of his people and for world peace. The US elections were a first-class democratic event. It was a complex election campaign, but one that was fascinating to follow. I am convinced that President Obama will serve a future of peace and prosperity, and from Russia I send my full appreciation and congratulations to the American people and the elected president. President Obama won thanks to his record and because he represents the future. I believe that everything he promised to do will be done. Throughout the way, he was a true friend of Israel. I am convinced it will remain this way in the future. It's wasn't President Obama who changed the United States, but there is no doubt that he is taking office to serving a different America.

Prime Minister Benjamin Netanyahu congratulated Obama saying: "The strategic alliance between Israel the U.S. is stronger than ever. I will continue to work with President Obama to protect the security interests of Israeli citizens."
Defence Minister Ehud Barak similarly was effusive in praise for Obama, a move that was highlighted by CNN's Wolf Blitzer.

Former New York City councilwoman Una Clarke told the Caribbean Media Corporation that she hoped the result would change the attitude of Republicans. "I think all the Republican chatter will now be silenced, and he'll get more cooperation in Congress. The President's coalition, including minorities and immigrants, held together. The Republicans will have to re-evaluate everything, including anti-Black sentiments. I was holding on to every word the president had to say in his victory speech."

Celebrations occurred in the city of Obama, which happens to share the president's name. Mayor Koji Matsuzaki planned to write a letter to Obama to congratulate him and "in the letter, he will say he wishes President Obama will lead the world and that the president will visit Obama the next time he is in Japan." City hall official Hirokazu Yomo said: "Four more years. So we are happy this will continue and help with building our city."
 – President Nursultan Nazarbayev congratulated Obama on his victory by sending him a telegram which called for "hope, progress, and opportunities" that are "welcomed and embraced by the people of Kazakhstan." Nazarbayev said that Kazakhstan is taking concrete measures in achieving in Obama's views on building a nuclear-weapon free world and hoped that further dialogues between two nations will strategic partnership.

 – President Mwai Kibaki said Obama's win was a re-affirmation of confidence in Obama's leadership and wished him for his second term with prayers for God's blessings. "On behalf of the Government and people of Kenya and on my own behalf I convey our congratulations to you, for your well deserved victory. I commend the American people for showing their confidence in your leadership. Kenya, as always is proud of our association with you. We look forward to the deepening of relations between our two countries during your second term in office," Prime Minister Raila Odinga also congratulated Obama saying: "Mr. Obama's success is particularly resonant in Africa this morning because not only is he an African American but the first American of immediate African descendant to have not only ascended to but succeeded in the most powerful and challenging office in the world." He added that the result would invigorate Obama's global supporters. Vice-President Kalonzo Mysoka and Deputy Prime Minister Musalia Mudavadi were also effusive in praise with Mudavadi saying: "He has made history as one of a few sitting presidents to be re-elected in America against a background of a poorly performing economy. His resilience is a lesson in how to turn adversity into opportunity;" he also congratulated Romney for his mature competition and conceding defeat honorably, while also calling on Kenyan political aspirants to emulate such manners in politics: "Elections and victory should be a celebration of the spirit of renewal rather than a contest for alienation of segments of society. I must applaud the two gentlemen and American voters for their sense of decency during campaigns and in both victory and defeat."
In Kogelo, Obama's extended family in the country, including Mama Obama, wished him well, were preparing to watch the election event. Sarah Obama said: "Much as I must thank the American people for this gesture, victory is Africa's as it solidifies our position in world leadership. It is God's plan and, most of all, he is an outstanding gentleman." His uncle, Said Hussein Obama, said: "We'll be staying together with the family watching it together until the result is announced. We expect he's going to win." However, the Washington Post reported a marked decrease in enthusiasm for the election as compared to the 2008 election.

 – President Atifete Jahjaga congratulated Obama on his re-election. "The Republic of Kosovo is a committed ally and a partner of the United States of America and we will continue to strongly engage in deepening the friendship and cooperation between our two countries and peoples. The United States of America has played the key role for the freedom and the right of the citizens of the Republic of Kosovo to be the masters of their own fate. We thank the United States under your leadership for playing an extraordinary role in the state-building process of the Republic of Kosovo, the advancement of the democratic process and our path toward the Euro-Atlantic integration."

 – Prime Minister Valdis Dombrovskis told LNT that "Latvia has excellent cooperation with the reelected administration of United States President Barack Obama." He added that even though Latvia was ready to work with whoever would have been elected, cooperation with the Obama administration had been "very good" and resulted in many successes.
U.S. Ambassador Mark Pekala said that relations would not result in significant changes as a result of the election, with the exception of a deepening in security, economic and personal contact matters. He added that Obama considers Latvia to be a good friend, ally and partner and that Obama return to office was good for Latvia as he had resolved to working closer together.

 – All three of Lebanon's highest ranking leaders from each of the three main communities reacted to the result. Maronite Christian President Michel Sleiman congratulated Obama by telegram and added that he should work towards resolving regional turmoil and that he "seize[s] this opportunity to stress to your Excellency my desire to bolster cooperation between our friendly countries, to develop our bilateral ties in all fields and to praise the support shown by your country to Lebanon, its institution and causes." Sunni Prime Minister Najib Mikati said: "What we hope from this election is that the U.S. administration moves ahead with supporting Lebanon's sovereignty and independence and bolsters bilateral ties between our countries and joint cooperation to enable the Lebanese Army and Internal Security Forces to extend their authority across Lebanon;" he added that a new term would generate "new momentum" to find a comprehensive solution to the Middle East peace process. Shia Speaker Nabih Berri also congratulated Obama by telegram and added that he hoped Obama second term would result in the international community passing resolutions to strengthen peace and security in the world, but particularly in the Middle East. Berri added that he hoped to see the fulfillment of the aspirations of the Palestinian people for a state of Palestine "because this is the prerequisite for achieving peace in the region. We in Lebanon are looking forward to continued U.S. support to Lebanon's stability and to strengthen democracy in it."
Loyalty to the Resistance bloc MP Hassan Hoballah decried: "The foreign policy of [the] US in the Middle East, and under all American presidents, was always biased in favor of Israel, regardless of who is the president, Democrat or Republican. The US has always stood against resistance movements in Lebanon or Palestine, and against every liberation movement aiming for independence and self-determination and development."

 – President Ellen Johnson Sirleaf congratulated Obama and said the election was "undoubtedly an affirmation of the continued confidence the people of the Great United States repose in visionary and distinguished leadership. [I hope] that the next term will be marked by even greater achievements at home and abroad."

 – President Dalia Grybauskaitė congratulated Obama and thanked Obama for the positive decisions he took that were of affect to Lithuania, such the permanent Baltic air-policing mission and the participation of U.S. troops, the reinforcement of NATO and the developing process towards the missile defense system. For his part, Prime Minister Andrius Kubilius said: "The election results do not make much difference for Lithuania, as – we have to put it very clearly – the Obama administration did a lot over the past four years to provide our region with certain important dimensions in terms of geopolitical safety. I mean NATO defense plans and the participation of US Armed Forces in various international maneuvers. As a conservative, I am always for the Republicans in my heart, but we have no complaints about this president whatsoever."
 US interim Chargé d'Affairs Anne Hall told a press conference in Lithuanian that the relations between the two countries would remain as strong as they were prior to the election. She added that both candidates did not diverge in terms of foreign policy as the main issues were economic and domestic policy. "The foreign policy will not change, he will continue with the rigid sanctions against Iran and will attempt to include Russia in the policy. As to the relations with Lithuania, they will remain just as strong."

 – Prime Minister Najib Razak said: "It is my hope that President Obama will continue in his efforts to foster understanding and respect between the US and Muslims around the world. [Malaysia] stands ready to help the US as it seeks to better engage with those of Islamic faith." He added that he hoped for a furtherance of relations to "maintain regional peace, stability and prosperity for our people." Deputy Higher Education Minister Saifuddin Abdullah looked towards the next Malaysian general election in reading the Obama campaigns strategies and the lessons it could offer the incumbent Barisan Nasional party. "Obama was sharp in connecting with the changing electorate, such as the increase in Latino voters, and he has maintained the support of the youths. The BN can learn from his campaign."
Former Deputy Prime Minister Anwar Ibrahim added his support for the voters who chose Obama for "backing a leader who reflects cultural and religious diversity." He also called on Obama to carry out his pledge to counter negative stereotypes of Islam, to seek a resolution to the Middle East conflict and to seek diplomacy and engagement with Iran.
U.S. Ambassador to Malaysia Paul Jones told the media that regardless of the result the U.S. would see to build on bilateral relations and would focus on ASEAN and Asia.

 – President Christopher Loeak extended felicitation to Obama on behalf of the country's government and people saying that he hoped the mandate would allow for the enhancement of relations between the two countries, including issues such as climate change and maritime security. His letter read: "Both Lieom and I had the opportunity of meeting you and First Lady Michelle Obama at the Dinner Reception following your statement at this year's United Nations General Assembly, at which time, I was reaffirmed of your determination to uphold the values of international cooperation, tolerance, and the values of freedom that makes the United States a unique model for us all."

Prime Minister Navin Ramgoolam congratulated Obama on his victory, in a letter that read: "Your election, Mr. President, is a clear endorsement by the people of the United States of America of your exceptional qualities to take your nation to still greater heights. I look forward to further consolidating our already strong bilateral ties; and wish to reiterate the willingness of my country to continue working closely with your administration in [the] international [arena] to fight the evils afflicting our world and as you rightly said, Mr. President, in your victory address: 'to shape a peace that is built on the promise of freedom and dignity for every human being.'"
Silvio Michel of the Green Party spoke of the Chagos Archipelago which were split from the Outer islands of Mauritius by the United Kingdom prior to its independence. The Chagossians were then expelled by the U.K. to allow the United States to establish a military base on Diego Garcia, the biggest island. He said: "Obama's administration is unwilling to accept any responsibility and thus unwilling to find a way for these people to return home. Mauritius cannot enter a case at either the United Nations Committee on Decolonization or at the International Criminal Court in The Hague. Both the British and American governments have threatened to take retaliatory action against our exports to their respective markets. Even today Britain is trying to impose a marine park in the region, which may be rich in oil. How can Mauritius admire such a president?

Recently elected and soon to take presidential office, Enrique Pena Nieto was quick to congratulate Obama on Twitter and added that he was looking forward to work together on common issues.
In response to Pena Nieto's scheduled meeting with Obama to discuss issues such as the War on Drugs, prior to both men taking office, Chihuahua state Governor Cesar Duarte said that Mexico should legalize the export of marijuana, amongst other changes, in light of the referendums in Washington and Colorado that legalized the recreational use of drugs.
Many residents of Mexico City expressed general satisfaction with the result. They also expressed the same reaction to the legalization of marijuana in state referendums.
U.S. Ambassador to Mexico E. Anthony Wayne told the Harvard Club that Obama's re-election "offers some important continuity to our relationship at a moment when the global economy is fragile and we have some tough issues to deal with at home. ... We will shortly welcome the new administration here in Mexico and look forward to an equally close and productive partnership as we have enjoyed over the last six years. Will a new Obama administration look at Mexico in a different way? I would argue that everyone, from both political parties and every level of government, is already looking at our relationship in a new way. We enjoy an unprecedented level of cooperation, thanks to ever-growing trust and constructive dialogue on many issues, and opportunities for continuing this cooperation are plentiful. From intelligence sharing in the fight against transnational organized crime to collaboration on border infrastructure, we work together in ways unthinkable a few short years ago. Our growing partnership is our greatest opportunity going forward.

 – President Nicolae Timofti congratulated Obama on behalf of the Moldovan people and himself. He wrote that he was confident Obama's "rich experience, extraordinary capabilities and resoluteness" would help the welfare of U.S. citizens and aid the U.S. "role ... in promoting democracy, freedom and human right observance all over the world" and that the U.S. has been a partner for Moldova "towards democracy and [a] market economy, and has always promoted the Republic of Moldova's Euro-integration and territorial integrity."
Former Ambassador to the U.S. and Director of the Moldovan Independent Institute of Strategic Researches Nicolae Chirtoaca said that the continuation of the Obama administration would aid in the reforms taking place in Moldova. Politically, the United States remains on the European Union's side in terms of supporting Moldova in its two chief directions – reform of the judiciary and struggle against corruption, as well as the Transnistrian conflict settlement" and that the U.S. calls for the unconditional withdrawal of Russian forces and arms to be replaced by international peacekeepers and civilian observers as it continues its role as an observer in the 5+2 format negotiations. "The re-election of Barack Obama will not in any way change the priority vectors of the bilateral relations development."

 – Prince Albert II wrote to Obama in English: "Dear Mr President. ... [I offer you my] warmest congratulations ... best wishes for the progress of the United States of America, the influence of its ideals and the wellbeing of the American people."

 – Prime Minister Igor Lukšić congratulated Obama and said that Montenegro–United States relations have been "friendly and constructive" since they began, while he hoped relations will be "further enriched by new ideas and initiatives." Such common interests entail partaking in peacekeeping missions around the world. "Given that our relations are continuously strengthened by our shared values and goals, we are proud to serve in a number of peacekeeping missions around the world and to stand shoulder to shoulder with the troops of other NATO countries in Afghanistan. I wish to thank you personally, Mr President, for your policy of supporting Montenegro, and the entire region, in our efforts to join the European and Euro-Atlantic structures, based on our merits and progress in meeting the accession requirements."

 – Prime Minister Nahas Angula told a local radio station said after the election that Obama "should respect Africa. He pushed for the killing of the Libyan president Muammar Gaddafi. That's not acceptable. We want the peaceful resolution of African issues. I hope he does something better in terms of respecting Africa in his second term. [I hope Obama does not] embarrass [Africa again].

 – President Ram Baran Yadav issues a statement that read he wished for the "continued progress and prosperity of the US under Obama's leadership" Prime Minister Baburam Bhattarai also congratulated Obama and issued a similar statement that expressed hope for a strengthening bilateral relations.

 – Prime Minister Mark Rutte said: "Congratulations to president Barack Obama on his re-election after an extremely exciting race. The Netherlands looks forward to continuing the excellent alliance with the Obama administration in a number of areas over the next four years. We want that to grow further in the future. The Netherlands will therefore put effort into establishing a free trade agreement between the U.S. and the European Union." Foreign minister Frans Timmermans added: "In a changed world, the trans-Atlantic relationship is an anchor. The Netherlands and its partners will continue to invest in this."

 – Prime Minister John Key said: "[It was a] very hard fought campaign that was always going to be tight and tough but he's come through with a solid victory. From New Zealand's point of view it's really a carry on of situation normal for us."

 – First Lady Rosario Murillo congratulated Obama saying: "I want to congratulate the North American people for their election yesterday that concluded with the reelection of President Barack Obama. I want to congratulate him with the warmth that the Nicaraguan people have toward the North American people on this day after the elections that will give continuity to the leadership of President Barack Obama."

 – President Goodluck Jonathan, whose own election campaign was similar to Obama's previous one, issued a statement that read: "President Jonathan welcomes president Obama's victory in an intensely fought presidential race as an endorsement by the good people of the United States of his leadership, progressive world view and the very good work he has done in the past four years towards ending global economic depression and fostering global peace and security." His spokesman, Dr. Reuben Abati, said the election was a reflection of his acceptability among the U.S. populace and that the result was an endorsement by them on his leadership, progressive world view and his work over the previous administration towards ending global economic depression and fostering global peace and security. "Nigeria, the Economic Community of West African States and the African Union enjoyed very cordial and productive relations with the Obama administration in his first term; President Jonathan looks forward to continuing to build on Nigeria and Africa's developmental collaboration with the United States in the next four years." The Federal Executive Council, chaired by Jonathan, said that the result was "significant to Africa and Nigeria." According to the Minister of Information and National Orientation Labaran Maku felicitated Obama and said that the situation in the U.S. was akin to that of the Jonathan coming to power. Oshodi Isolo II MP in the House Lawrence Ayeni said of the electoral process that it should be replicated in Nigeria so as to develop and shape its political culture to give credibility to future elections. "We still have a long way to go in Nigerian politics and that is why we must learn fast to achieve credible elections in 2015."
Senate Leader Victor Ndoma-Egba expressed hope that Africa would get better attention in Obama second term than it did in the first term and that "it is a big relief that Obama won the election." Senate spokesman Enyinnaya Abaribe said Obama's win was a challenge to Nigeria. "Nigeria can draw so many lessons and inspiration from Obama's victory. The most important one is that some barriers are currently being broken. No part of this country should be excluded from leadership because everyone has everybody has something to offer." The House also congratulated Obama.
Former CPC presidential candidate General Muhammadu Buhari told the CPC Board of Trustees that Obama deserved to win: "The second coming of Obama is another big achievement in the United States of America and we congratulate them as a country and as a people. He worked for it, he deserved it and he got it. His fundamental believe to the government responsibility to look after the weak in terms of the health policies and heavier one for the strong is good achievement and it has saved him. And all are behind him and the system is working."
Political bickering also occurred after the incumbent Peoples Democratic Party accused the opposition parties of being bad losers after it congratulated Obama immediately and asked why the opposition does not accept defeat in such a manner as was the quick acceptance of defeat by Romney. The Action Congress of Nigeria and the Congress for Progressive Change both, separately, attacked the PDP for being the major obstacle to democracy in Nigeria. The ACN said the joke was on the PDP and specifically cited why the Olusola Oke from the recent Ondo State gubernatorial election was in court if there had been a level playing field.
The Nigeria Labour Congress said the result should set an example for Nigeria through a statement issued in Kaduna State by Vice President and General Secretary of the National Union of Textile Garment and Tailoring Workers of Nigeria who echoed the words of Martin Luther King Jr.'s I have a dream speech. "We join the rest of the world to congratulate President Barack Obama on his re-election for second term in office as the President of United States of America. His clear victory at the November 6, 2012, America's election has shown that the only sustainable politics is the one based on the aspirations of the people." The Campaign for Democracy's President Dr. Joe Okei also added: "Obama's re-election with both popular and electoral college votes in the midst a heated campaign that brought out all that divides America is a testimony to the triumph of vision, focused leadership and an enduring human spirit over atavistic fault lines."
U.S. Ambassador Terrence McCulley called on Nigerians to work together to surmount their differences and seek accountability and transparency from those they elect so as to foster democracy. He told a post-election breakfast meeting with unnamed leading government officials and stakeholders that the people of the U.S. demand this from their leaders. He also described the result as a "great celebration" of democracy in the U.S.

 – President Dervis Eroglu congratulated Obama and wished, in a statement, that he would "increase his success in the new period and take fruitful steps for the USA people and for the world. The world which belongs to all of us needs reciprocal understanding, cooperation justice and peace." He also attributed Obama's win to in spite of the difficulties in his country and in the world with his patient and decisive attitude" and that "we believe that USA led by Obama shall use their power over our Greek neighbors and shall do whatever needed towards reaching an agreement in Cyprus and towards getting rid of the embargoes imposed on the Turkish Cypriot people by the Greek Cypriots."

 – Labour Prime Minister Jens Stoltenberg congratulated Obama on his re-election, stating that "Norway has cooperated well with him during his first four years, and I look forward to cooperat[ing] with him during [the next] four new years;" he added that although his government would have cooperated well with a Mitt Romney presidency "Obama stands for political values and points of view that are closer to ours."

 – According to Wafa, West Bank President Mahmoud Abbas congratulated Obama and hoped that he would continue to seek peace in the Middle East. Chief negotiator Saeb Erekat urged Obama to make changes and support Palestine's bid to become a member of the UN. "We have decided to take our cause to the United Nations this month, and we hope that Obama will stand by us."
Hamas leader Mahmoud Zahar hoped that Obama would change his "biased" policy that favors Israel and that if the policy was maintained "nothing will change in the Middle East." The party's spokesman Sami Abu Zuhri said that the Palestinians, as well as other Arab and Islamic countries, would judge the U.S. on the basis of Obama's policy towards the peoples and countries.
Palestinian People's Party Secretary-General Bassam Salhi expressed pessimism about the outlook for Obama's second term in office.

 – President Asif Ali Zardari congratulated Obama on his re-election. A statement issued by the foreign ministry on behalf of Zardari read: "We warmly felicitate President Barack Obama on his re-election as the President of the United States of America. President Zardari expressed the hope that the relationship between Pakistan and the US would continue to prosper during President Obama's new term in office." Furthermore, Zardari described him as "very reassuring for the AfPak region." A Pakistani foreign ministry spokesperson stated that Romney's election as president might have upset plans for the U.S. to begin drawing down troops from Afghanistan by 2014. An unnamed foreign ministry official said: "Any move to speed up the withdrawal of troops from Afghanistan could have been hugely dangerous with Mitt Romney as President. Such a withdrawal will only make the Taliban feel very empowered."
Tehreek-e-Insaaf chairperson Imran Khan described Obama as someone whose "natural instincts are against war" and called on him to "give peace a chance. What Pakistan would be hoping for is a de-escalation of violence in Afghanistan and the drone attacks in Pakistan's tribal areas. Now he (Obama) is no longer under pressure to be re-elected. We hope he will give peace a chance, which we so desperately need." He also said that the first Obama administration had been "very tough on Pakistan", primarily due to the use of drones that resulted in "increased militancy.

 – President Ollanta Humala congratulated Obama in a letter that read that Humala had confidence in the further strengthening of bilateral relations: "I'm convinced the two countries will continue strengthening the excellent cooperation, dialogue and understanding that we have constructed."

 – President Benigno Aquino III wrote a letter to congratulate Obama on his re-election. Aquino wrote that he is confident that Obama will "continue to harness the voices and ideas" of the country's citizens and "empower them further" as he moves the United States of America forward. Vice President Jejomar Binay also issued a short statement congratulating Obama and his counterpart Biden. Both Filipino leaders expressed confidence in the continued strengthening of the decades-old alliance between the two countries.
The United States Ambassador to the Philippines, Harry K. Thomas, Jr., characterized Obama's re-election as a "great victory for democracy." A mock election, sponsored by the U.S. Embassy, was also held at the same time as the election. Of the 2,129 participants from seven Filipino cities, 76% voted for Obama.

 – Foreign Minister Radek Sikorski said that he did not see Hungary's Navracsics hope as bearing fruit as "traditionally, second term presidents, especially from the Democratic Party, try to do more to resolve the Israeli-Palestinian conflict. [Obama] has already promised to help establish a Palestinian state."

 – The Kremlin welcomed the election and was eager to boost relations. President Vladimir Putin's spokesman Dmitry Peskov said: "Overall the Kremlin welcomes the news of Barack Obama's victory in the elections. We express hope that the positive beginnings in bilateral relations and in international cooperation between Russian and the United States, in the interest of international security, will develop and improve." Prime Minister Dmitry Medvedev added during a trip to Vietnam: "For us, he (Obama) is an understandable and predictable partner. That is the most important thing in politics. I am happy that the president of a very big, very influential state is not a man who considers Russia to be its enemy number one. That is funny. It's some kind of paranoia." Sergey Lavrov called for equality in relations. "We will continue to work with this administration. We are ready, on the basis of mutual equality, mutual profit and mutual respect ... to go as far as the U.S. administration is willing to go." He also said of Romney that he was "glad that the president of a very big and very influential country won't be the man who considers Russia enemy No. 1." The Italian media suggested relief on the Russian part that Romney did not win. Putin had also said, prior to the election, that he favored an Obama win.

 – The Minister of Foreign Affairs and Cooperation Louise Mushikiwabo welcomed the result saying:

Rwanda congratulates President Barack Obama upon his re-election. I think it is a good thing and look forward to continue the good relationship we share with America. I don't speak for Africa but on behalf of Rwanda, I expect that we keep moving forward. We don't put demands on foreign leaders therefore we hope to strengthen our relationship at different levels of cooperation with the American people.

 – President Danilo Türk cabled Obama with a congralutory message and told the American Chamber of Commerce's breakfast meeting with presidential candidates the next morning of Obama's "unwavering commitment to global peace and security. Barack Obama is a great leader with great potential for the future. Obama's re-election is a "new energy and a revival of the characteristic American optimism. Obama did a lot in his first term, proved that he's fighting for the right changes." He pointed to Obamacare as a specific issue Obama had handled. Speaker of Parliament Gregor Virant told the event: "As Obama's supporter I'm glad he won. Even if [Mitt] Romney won, this would not much change relations between Slovenia and the US. I think the outcome is good. For Slovenia, Obama's re-election means a continuation of the excellent political relations. The political relations between the two countries are really very good, but there's always potential for economic cooperation. What we need most now is investment" and that he hoped Slovenia was as important to the U.S. as the other side of the relationship. He also congratulated U.S. Ambassador Joseph Mussomeli
Presidential candidate Borut Pahor said Obama was a "great inspiration to everyone and a great hope for all the world. I think he is deservedly president again today and that he'll probably do even more than is expected of him in the next four years having no longer to worry about his re-election."
Pohor's rival in the Slovenian election, Milan Zver, added that he expected a different approach by Obama in his second administration as to when he "tried to deliver on the election promises four years ago, when he promised a major change. While Zver also talked of Obamacare as one of Obama's biggest achievements, which were closer to the social life style of Europeans, he further expected a focus on other neglected areas such as foreign policy and the Middle East peace process, as well as economy actions.
Mussomeli told those who gathered that there was a likelihood of Slovenian expatriates living in the crucial swing-state of Ohio who supported Obama. AmCham Slovenia President Matej Potokar said that voters in the U.S. "obviously realised the U.S. got on the right track in the latest term under President Barack Obama and they opted for continuity. Now comes the moment of truth. There has been election race and election rhetoric. The problems for the US and the rest of the world remain. The voters obviously believed the platform presented by President Obama." He also said that European Union–United States relations could deepen. "The US and Europe are traditional partners. New trends bring new rules of the game, capital markets are moving elsewhere. Emerging economies are very aggressive and traditional markets such as the US or the EU will need to come even closer together to find their right place in the new situation. [However, e]lections as such don't bring economic growth."

 – President James Michel welcomes the result saying it was a "testament of the American people's trust in his leadership and vision." His letter to Obama also mentioned commonalities in foreign relations based on "shared prosperity, good governance, peace and stability;" strong relations, particularly in regard to maritime security in the Indian Ocean, including against piracy in the region; and he congratulated U.S. citizens for the election that was "symbolic of the capacity of the American people to rise above adversity [following Hurricane Sandy] to become ever stronger and more resilient."

 – Newly elected President Hassan Sheikh Mohamud congratulated Obama the next day saying: "In my own name and on behalf of the Somali Government and people, I am pleased to offer my warmest congratulations to you on your re-election and wish you every success for your second term in office. United States of America is a key strategic partner of the Federal Republic of Somalia and we look forward to continuing the close cooperation established over the years and further strengthening our bilateral ties. As your leadership is vital to meeting global challenges, I am sure you will continue to play a leading role in the global issues that are facing the world." He felcitated the people of the U.S. on their decision.

 – President Jacob Zuma congratulated Obama and said: "We value our relations with the United States and look forward to strengthening bilateral co-operation in the years to come." Zuma's international relations adviser Lindiwe Zulu said she was pro-Obama: "We are hoping that this time around he will even be able to visit South Africa, because if he doesn't, we won't forgive him for that! We also hope that in the next four years Africa will occupy a higher space in his agenda. In his own words, he says the best is yet to come, so we're looking out for that best that he's talking about from an African perspective." (Previously Obama had been criticized for spending less than one day in sub-Saharan Africa when he visited Ghana briefly in 2009.)
Former First Lady Winnie Madikizela-Mandela said: "We all need an Obama presidency. [The win] brought tears to my eyes."

 – The president of the newest UN member state, Salva Kiir, sent a cable congratulating Obama. It also read:

On behalf of the people of the Republic of South Sudan and on my own behalf, I extend our congratulations on your impressive victory in the United States of America's presidential election and on the vote of support you received from the citizens of your country. I sincerely wish you a good health, personal happiness and every success in taking on the new responsibilities and ensuring well-being, security in the World and in our region. Our relations are built in the spirit of shared commitment to democratic stable, united and prosperous South Sudan. Our joint work to ensure regional stability and close people to people contacts will continue to promote mutual understanding and dialogue between the United States and South Sudan, while our common efforts will overcome all challenges. I strongly believe and hope that cooperation between United States and South Sudan under your leadership will be further developed and enhanced.

 – President Mahinda Rajapaksa congratulated Obama, saying the win was reflective of acceptance of his commitment to change in such important aspects of U.S. policy as foreign relations.

 – Prime Minister Denzil Douglas wrote to Obama that the U.S. people had "reaffirmed their faith and confidence in your vision, your leadership and your ability to move the country forward in the face of differences and diversity. Your diligence, tenacity, and fervour of the first four years have inspired them to believe that indeed, 'the best is yet to come.' You have been afforded a great opportunity to pursue your goal of building on the progress you have begun, reaching across the aisle to build consensus for the common good."

 – Prime Minister Dr. Ralph Gonsalves called Obama a "friend of St. Vincent and the Grenadines ... and the Caribbean" in congratulating him. and Biden on the "overwhelming victory".

 – President Desi Bouterse congratulated Obama and wished him success in moving toward an economic recovery. "Our best wishes to you, your family and the people of the United States on this victory, which now enables you to continue on the path set out in 2008 for recovery of the major financial crisis in the US, which also affected the international community. In your campaign trail you used the word 'forward' and promised that the benefits from the aforementioned crisis will soon be feasible in the US economy and in the affected countries ..." He talked of Suriname–United States relations as being a "cordial friendship" and that he looked forward to meeting Obama again.

 – Prime Minister Fredrik Reinfeldt spoke of the issues ahead. "They have a huge debt and huge deficit. How they manage it will affect demand. This is a country that accounts for 20 percent of the world's demands for exports and it will affect China and Europe, and therefore Sweden"; while he also congratulated Obama: "He's been re-elected and has run a good and inclusive campaign. The Democrats are better at speaking to the whole of the United States."
Social Democratic chairman Stefan Löfven said he hoped the Democratic Party would have a real party "to celebrate the Obama win. When you look at Obama's campaign, you see there is a belief that politics and not just the market can make a difference." Though he also said he was "disappointed" with Obama's foreign policy in the Middle East and that there should be a more proactive foreign policy. Former party spokesman on economic plicy and MP Thomas Östros said that the result was "well-deserved. It has been a tremendously difficult time with the economic downturn. It's going to be interesting to see what he can do with four years in a better economic environment. I think the election result when it comes to values is very important for Europe. We've had an offensive period from right-wing conservatives and they have been defeated, and that will influence Europe; to see that modern values are winning in the US means a lot in Europe. I think [the fiscal cliff] will be solved because Americans solve these sorts of issues. Late, perhaps, but they do it. Perhaps after this defeat there will also be some Republicans who are willing to be more reasonable. I hope that Obama can be a little bit bolder in foreign policy, particularly in the Middle East, now that he doesn't have to be worried about re-election." Östros told The Local.
Green Party spokeswoman Åsa Romson said: "It's great news. Barack Obama stands for a modern view on issues such as women's rights, migration, and security policy. He's a better representative for the diverse society that the United States is today." Though she added that Obama should "live up to the high expectations and take responsibility" in regard to climate issues around the world. However, another party MP, Mathias Sundin said that while he understood Swedes predisposition to side with the Democratic Party, the media were to blame for the unfair portrayal of the Republican Party: "Reporting on Democrats focuses on their accomplishments, while stories about Republicans focus on their views on abortion and the death penalty, for example. Everyone here assumes that Republicans are terrible, evil, right-wing extremists." He added that open support for the Republican Party in Sweden could make for a "strange existence. You get weird questions and are always on the defensive having to explain your views."
The Liberal Party's Integration Minister Erik Ullenhag told several hundred attendees of a U.S. embassy event that also had other cabinet members and MPs said he was happy of Obama win but that "I was quite surprised [Obama was declared the winner so early]. If you'd asked me two weeks ago, I would have bet on Romney."
U.S. ambassador Mark Brzezinski, who has held the position since October 2011 wholly under the tenure of the Obama administration, said: "Four years ago, I never would have imagined that I'd be here in Stockholm celebrating the US election. It is awesome to share this with our Swedish friends and our diplomat friends."

 –
A fundraiser was held for the Democratic Party that Reuters called "biggest fundraising event abroad" for the Obama/Biden campaign.Democrats Abroad Switzerland issued a statement reading that the event was the "single most important fundraising event [outside the United States for Obama's campaign]." The former chairman of the organization, Walter Furth, said of the event: "George Clooney, he spoke for about three to four minutes, very little. He just said we're doing good work and to keep it up." Also speaking were the chairman of the Obama Victory Fund, Matthew Berzun, and the Geneva-based lawyer on the National Finance Committee of the campaign.
George Clooney said: "I'm very proud to be here and to be supporting the next President of the United States. He deserves another four years to finish what he started."

 – Free Syrian Army Commander Ahmed Nima told The Guardian: "I hope Romney wins. He said during his campaign that he would try to do something for Syria. We want him to help us get weapons and impose a no-fly zone in some parts of Syria to put an end to the bombardment by Assad's planes." Spokesman for the Syrian National Council George Sabra said from Doha that he hoped as a result of the win Obama would offer more support to the Syrian fighters. "We hope this victory for President Obama will make him free more to make the right decision to help freedom and dignity in Syria and all over the world." He also called for more weapons in aid from the international community.
Al Jazeera's Hashem Alhelberra said that the SNC has called for Obama to be more aggressive as part of the Syrian Civil War.
Opposition activist Faissal Shawki wrote on Twitter that the U.S. "allows the Syrian murderer to crush the revolution, because the US fears democracy, it is not in their interests."

 – President Emomali Rahmon wrote to Obama congratulating him and mentioning his appreciation of the level of partnership between the two countries on such issues of mutual benefit that include politics, security and socioeconomic and cultural-humanitarian aspects; while Tajikistan also wanted to expand cooperation.

 – National Assembly Chairman Mussa Zungu said from Dodoma that Obama won because "President Obama pushed for government-funded healthcare schemes to poor Americans and more tax for rich, the policies that Governor Romney and his supporters were against." Chama cha Mapinduzi MP for Kigamboni Faustine Ndugulile said that elections in Tanzania should focus on party manifestos. "The US campaigns were dominated by the economy, jobs, power and national security agenda. This is how it should be even here." He said Romney's concession indicated political maturity.
Special Seats-CUF MP Magdalena Sakaya said: "From the word go to the end of the race, we did not heard any act of injustice against voters and the government did not use force against any one."
The Chairman of the Committee of Six, a coalition government in Zanzibar, Ali Mzee Ali echoed the sentiment in saying learning to concede defeat should be replicated in the country.
U.S. Ambassador to Tanzania Alfonso Lenhardt told journalists at an Election Day Breakfast the result was "a testimony [to a] free, fair, transparent and peaceful" and that "other countries can learn from the US."

 – Prime Minister Kamla Persad-Bissessar wrote to the Trinidad Express: "[Obama] he earned his re-election, he remained grounded in the politics of hope and delivery to the people. Congrats President Obama, Obama lives on."

 – Acting President Moncef Marzouki congratulated Obama on the renewed mandate he received. The message also highlighted the binding the two countries which "were further strengthened after the revolution of freedom and dignity in Tunisia" and that Marzouki was confident Obama's new term would give a fresh impetus to the two countries' relations and elevate them to a level of "strategic partnership."

 – While on a flight to Indonesia upon hearing of electoral result, Prime Minister Recep Tayyip Erdogan congratulated Obama. He also said that he had not pressed the U.S. on taking further action in Syria due to the electoral campaign but would not change in asking for a "totally different" attitude.

 – Prime Minister David Cameron sent his congratulations from Jordan to Obama saying: "I would like to congratulate Barack Obama on his re-election. I have really enjoyed working with him over the last few years and I look forward to working with him again over the next four years. ... Above all, congratulations to Barack. I've enjoyed working with him, I think he's a very successful US president and I look forward to working with him in the future." At the refugee camp for Syrians, he added that Obama's new administration should further initiatives should be taken to strengthen the opposition fighters in Syria and that there was a need to "shape the opposition" into a coherent force and to open channels of communication with the said forces. During a telephone conversation later in the week, Cameron reiterated his congratulation to Obama personally and discussed international issues that need to be tackled with, including a resolution to the liking on Syria and the aftermath of the Libyan civil war.
Deputy Prime Minister Nick Clegg said that Obama's reelection was proof that the electorate have "long memories" about those who he said had initiated the global financial crisis.
Leader of the Opposition Ed Miliband commented on the result as a desire for a "fairer economy."

 – Following a recent re-election himself, President Hugo Chávez said: "I hope this doesn't harm Obama, but if I was from the United States, I'd vote for Obama." However, the day before the election he also added that whoever wins the election would not offer much change. He later said that "[Obama] should reflect first on his own nation, which has a lot of economic and social problems. It's a divided, socially fractured country with a super-elite exploiting the people. He should dedicate himself [instead] to governing his country and forget dividing and invading other nations."

 – President Mohamed Abdelaziz sent a congratulatory message to Obama and called for U.S. and the international community to redouble efforts to find a solution to the Western Sahara dispute. "We hope that the U.S., under his leadership, become more involved in the efforts of the international community for the decolonization of Western Sahara, the last colony in Africa. The Saharawi people, who are victims of foreign occupation for more than three decades, have always considered the United States a strong defender of freedom, democracy and respect for human rights and peoples, a tenacious opponent of tyranny and injustice in the world."

 – President Michael Sata congratulated Obama's, via his Special Assistant for Press and Public Relations George Chellah, saying his re-election was an "affirmation of the trust and confidence the people ... in his leadership" and that Obama had gotten an endorsement of his leadership. He added that furthering United States–Zambia relations was important "at this critical time in the political, social and economic evolution of the African continent", and this is according to a statement released by President Sata's Special Assistant for Press and Public Relations, George Chellah.
MMD President Nevers Mumba congratulated Obama and the people of the U.S. "for demonstrating once again to the world that a free and credible democratic process was the panacea for both peace and national development."

 – Education Minister David Coltart wrote on Twitter: "Congratulations @BarackObama on your victory. My prayer is that you will use your 2nd term to help the #peace process in #Zimbabwe. It takes an election in such a vast country and so close to show us #Zimbabweans what we need to do if we are to respect our right to elect."
The Movement for Democratic Change released a statement that read: "The MDC congratulates the Americans for displaying such immense degree of maturity in the run up, during and after the election. It is inspiring to all of us in the fight for democracy to note that it is possible for a people to openly and freely demonstrate their divergent viewpoints without acrimony but respect and tolerance of each other's preferences. The world and Zimbabwe in particular should emulate the level of political maturity as displayed by the Americans during their election period. The humility shown by Romney in conceding defeat is humbling. As we look forward to our elections next year we implore the people of Zimbabwe to rise above petty political differences and respect one another as we exercise our democratic right to choose who will represent us in the next government in a free and peaceful environment. ... The MDC continues to push for the creation of better condition for a sustainable election in Zimbabwe before the holding of watershed elections next year in which the nation hopes to bring in a new and different kind of governance for the sustainable development of the country."

International organizations
 – President Herman Van Rompuy and European Commission President Jose Manuel Barroso issued a joint statement that read: "The US is a key strategic partner of the EU and we look forward to continuing the close cooperation...to further strengthening our bilateral ties and to jointly addressing global challenges, including in the fields of security and economy." European Parliament President Martin Schulz said: "In the last two-to-three years, from time to time, we felt a certain kind of 'fatigue' in the relationship between the EU and the United States of America. The re-election of Barack Obama on the basis of his program is an encouragement for all of us, for more cooperation on the basis [of] our common interests in the fight against worldwide speculation, [the] fight against the problems of climate change and in cooperation for peace, justice and development worldwide."

 – Secretary General Anders Fogh Rasmussen said: "President Obama has demonstrated outstanding leadership in maintaining this vital bond, and I look forward to continuing our close cooperation to ensure NATO remains effective in a fast-changing world."

 OSCE – A statement was issued by the observation mission of the OSCE Office for Democratic Institutions and Human Rights exclaiming that the election had been "administered in a professional manner" but recommended that a number of concerns about the electoral process be addressed. Specifically the voters' registration process was said to need improvement since about 50 million eligible citizens were not registered. Other criticism included insufficient transparency of the parties' campaign spending and the barring of international election observers from polling stations in several states.

Financial markets
With the result reaching Asia in the morning, stock market indices around the continent rose as did currencies as a result of Obama's win. However, futures markets in the U.S. fell on the news. The Aussie appreciated to its greatest level against the United States dollar in six weeks following the news of the result. Japan's stock market indices also fell as a result of a stronger yen following the result. Iran's stock market index rose and its recently depreciating currency rose slightly in the wake of Obama's win. The United States stock market indices fell over 2% the following day in response to a split Congress. That week, the U.K.'s FTSE index also fell over the same concerns. The Taiwan dollar also rose to a 14-month high on news of the result. Chile's IPSA stock market index also fell on the news of the result. In reaction to the result, the Hungarian Forint rose on speculation of an increase in risk appetite sentiment. It also result in a decrease in sovereign bond yields.

Media
The Christian Science Monitor suggested that a swing in the Cuban American vote towards the Democrats, both for Obama and newly elected Representative Joe Garcia, as reflective of the changing demographics in the community, both to younger workers and newly arrived immigrants, seeking a rapprochement with Cuba. 
Cuban national newspaper CubaSi headlined the result as: "U.S. elections: the worst one did not win." 
Fox News reported on a shifting global focus as a result of the election to enhance efforts at regime change in Syria through armed means. 
Reuters suggested Obama would struggle in the face of a Latin American "revolt" against what used to be contempously called the "United States' backyard." It cited such conflicts as the War on Drugs and furthering more free trade agreements. It also reported disappointment in Africa over Obama's first term. 
Bloomberg highlighted Obama's challenges for his second term as including the changing landscape over the Arab Spring and "reviving Arab–Israeli peace talks, reducing terrorists' capabilities and ending the Syrian civil war before it destabilizes neighbors Lebanon and Jordan and strengthens Islamic extremists." 
China's Xinhua issued an op-ed that read: "As the U.S. presidential candidates enter into the final stretch of their months-long campaigns, Election Day, which falls on Tuesday local time, will not only end with the announcement of who will be the next U.S. president, but also, hopefully, with a pause in the China-bashing game." 
The South China Morning Post mentioned the Chinese fascination with the election, while Japan Today featured an opinion poll showing Japanese and Chinese citizens' support for Obama. Israel's Haaretz stated that "Israeli Americans are from Mars while Jewish Americans are from Venus." 
An All Africa op-ed suggested Romney would win, while Australia's Daily Telegraph election coverage entailed a title article of Romney's car trouble. 
Der Spiegel wrote that another Obama term could add fuel to the fire of burdensome relations and pressure on relations with Europe following criticism of the E.U.'s response to the European sovereign debt crisis. 
North Korea's Rodong Sinmun wrote: "They (the United States) never open their mouths without slandering our socialist system and twaddling about sanction and blockade against us;" it added that it would not cave in to external pressures contrary to the country's interests. 
Mexican columnist Leon Krauze wrote of Obama's shortcomings as president but that "the alternative is much, much worse."
Radio Australia interviewed the University of Hawaii's Tarcisius Kabutaulaka who called for further engagement with Pacific Island states as China was outpacing the U.S. in providing aid.
The Kyiv Post wrote, the day before the election, of its endorsement for Obama as its perception that he would be better for the U.S., "Ukraine and the world." 
The March 14 alliance-supporting Now Lebanon said that the result's implication for Lebanon would be indirect and long-term. It cited those it interviews as saying that the U.S. has let France lead the West's stance on Lebanon and that nothing much will change with the U.S. result; it further noted others as saying a Romney win would further the Lebanon along the side of March 14 and also could have helped end the Syrian conflict by arming the FSA. 
Al Hayat's Raghida Dergham said that Obama would not be more confident and the new term would test the "firmness of his resolve or the skillfulness of his elusiveness" in regard to foreign policy issues as the Iranian nuclear program. She also added that Obama may have learnt from past mistakes of making of having made too many predictions and promises such as that of resolving the Arab–Israeli conflict. 
Voice of Russia political commentator Dmitry Babich said of the election that it was a lack of durable alternatives in regard to foreign policy, in particular, and that he also hoped for change in foreign policy but could see none.
Jerusalem Post discussed the repercussions for Israel. It mentioned two key themes as being: minimizing antagonism and coping with the negative consequences of U.S. regional policy. It further noted the situation after the 2011 Egyptian revolution as being a challenge more dire than Pakistan.
Yonhap said that the re-election of Obama (along with the leadership change in China due to take place) could usher in change on the Korean Peninsula as it "induce North Korea to ease confrontational policies and possibly adopt an engagement stance;" it added that the result "gave breathing room to North Korea, whose policy options would have been far more limited if Republican rival Mitt Romney, a hard-liner, had been elected."
The Associated Press highlighted some of the challenges facing Obama as a "world of problems." In doing so it cited the issues it sees as problems such as the Iran's nuclear program, the Syrian civil war, a potential for engaging what it called "other repressive countries such as Cuba and North Korea" and a new focus on the "moribund Middle East peace efforts." Though it added the first priority was the changing of the guard in his cabinet. 
The Herald quoted Zimbabwean analysts as saying that Obama was the lesser of two evil and they hoped for a rapprochment of ties between the two countries. 
Angola Press suggested that "Obama fever" had waned during this election vis-a-vis the previous one as he had not reciprocated with increased U.S. engagement across the continent; it also cited his only fleeting visit to Ghana as his only Africa stopover during the first term. 
The Daily Star suggested that an Obama win could be good for Bangladesh-United States relations and the main goal was to see economic access via reduced tariffs to the U.S. market for its garment exporters.
Bhutanomics spoke of the possibility of a new era with Obama in the United States, and compared it to a changing political landscape in Bhutan, concluding that "the USA and Bhutan have lost opportunities that come once in a hundred years." 
Italy's Ansa reported on changing attitudes towards Obama across the Arab world after the "honeymoon faded," citing the lack of positive progress over Israel–Palestinian relations. 
Rwandan New Times reported a survey it carried as suggesting the country's people had high expectation that Obama would do good for Rwanda and Africa as a whole. 
Aikyn claimed that Obama won because of a tumar given to him by Kazakh President Nursultan Nazarbayev.
The Hankyoreh discussed Obama's policy vis-a-vis the Korean peninsula, with Yonhap talking of close cooperation on the issue of North Korea with South Korea.
The New Democrat headlined the result saying "Emulate Americans, Eschew Politics of Bitterness." 
Rwandan outlets Rwanda Focus and the New Times reacted to the result with the former saying that the result may have been good for the U.S. and its people but "Not Undemocratic, Corrupt Africans," while the latter echoed the sentiment and added:

About Michelle Obama, the First Lady, to come and help African women, no way; we should help ourselves and be reminded that America has more than 300 million people out of whom 52 per cent are women and many of them in need of Michelle Obama; so charity begins at home please! Let us work hard and be productive; did you notice that only in Africa some people even decided to have a holiday because Obama had won election when in America itself and Washington DC business went on as usual! Africa needs to wake up. 
The St. Kitts and Nevis Observer used the election to criticize its local social dynamics in an op-ed that read: "It is clear that Kittitians and Nevisians are more concerned with President Barack Obama and Mitt Romney than they are with what Denzil Douglas and his cronies are doing to the country where they 'born, grow and live'. They are too busy making sure America's backyard is in order while their backyard is being sold out from under them." 
The Sudan Tribune discussed Obama second term and its implications for Sudan and South Sudan, while also saying the second Obama administration would focus more on foreign policy as "global stability and peace are so detrimental to the US national security." It said Obama was better for Sudan as Romney, who did not discuss much foreign policy during his campaign, was tougher in dealing with what it called "reckless and tyrant" states, though he could still up the ante in his second term. 
The Swazi Observer wrote of the issue of racism in the United States after pointing to Africa-wide celebrations of his first term election win. "Obama may be the black man's impression of an African angel but his victory as America's president for the second time has spurred his enemies into action." It went on to discuss expectations of an African agenda for the Obama administration, but concluded that since Africans

identify with this great man let us take the opportunity to put the African back to his place in the world map, the place of ability and willpower to overcome challenges such as poverty and ignorance; to overcome greed through sacrifice, hard work and love in pursuit of happiness. Obama has proven that is possible. All the things about racism will fall away. Let us support Obama by portraying him in the manner that he is, the future is yet to come.

Tonganz wrote that the election, along with the political process in New Zealand, offered examples to the politics of Tonga in that both Obama and the Pasefika appeal in New Zealand should bring change to local politics in the appeals to minorities (particularly hispanics in the U.S. case, women and other special interests. 
New Vision wrote of all elections in Uganda, particularly the 2011 Ugandan general election, needing to learn from this process in terms of the Obama campaign's data mining in using the research as an advantage when it analyzed the gender, ethnicity and age from the relevant states and then tailor the message for them. 
The Financial Gazette said that Obama win would not change United States-Zimbabwe relations as it would continue sanctions against the country. Similarly, Zimbabwe's The Herald wrote: "What is the difference between George W. Bush—the self-proclaimed "War President"—and Barrack [sic] Hussein Obama, the first African-American president of the United States? It appears one is light skinned and the other dark skinned, forget the so-called Republican-Democrat divide, the two are like peas in a pod for the US presidency is a straitjacket."

Individuals
Two days after the election, WikiLeaks founder Julian Assange said of Obama that he was a "wolf in sheep's clothing" and that he expected continued suppression attempts of Wikileaks; he added that the victory was not a cause for celebration.

Obama seems to be a nice man, and that is precisely the problem. It's better to have a sheep in wolf's clothing than a wolf in sheep's clothing. All of the activities against WikiLeaks by the United States have occurred under an Obama administration. The Republican party has not been an effective restraining force on government excesses over the last four years. There is no reason to believe that will change—in fact, the Republicans will push the administration into ever greater excesses. The re-election of Barack Obama coincides with the 899th day of Bradley Manning's confinement.

Others
Vice President of Foreign Policy Studies at the Brookings Institution, Martin Indyk, said of the coming year that relations with Iran would be decisive, "It's going to be very high on the agenda. Preventing Iran from getting nuclear weapons is a critical imperative for bolstering the nonproliferation regime." Director of RAND International Security and Defense Policy Center, James Dobbins, said of implication for the Syrian Civil War that: "I don't think it's viable to stand aside if Syria gets worse and unless the Iranians are stupid enough to give us a better rationale for an unprovoked attack, I don't think the administration would do it." Head of the Washington D.C.-based Inter-American Dialogue Michael Shifter said of Latin America's reaction to Obama:

Director of Universidad de Chile's Institute of National Studies José Morandé said: "The idea is that Obama is more functional to the current relationship between the two governments. There are good vibes between Obama and the president of Chile." The Deputy Director of the Institute of Public Affairs of the Universidad de Chile Robert Funk added:

Latin America is not a priority in terms of foreign policy in the general sense, or at least in the short term. No one's going to come to Chile because Obama won. That didn't happen last time, and this time people actually know what Obama's about. It's a challenge for Chile. Brazil is going to become a major power in the region and Chile's going to have to find a way to deal with that and to balance that with the United States. It will be interesting to see how Chile plays its loyalties.

The London-based Royal United Services Institute's analyst Shashank Joshi also said: "With the re-election of Obama, what you have is a strong confidence on the British side that the U.S. administration will be engaged more on Syria from the get-go." Bahraini analyst Ahmed el Morched wrote: "As Arabs we are interested in how will a Democratic president deal with our problems. Will he free himself of the Jewish lobby?" Dr Tang Siew Mun, the director of foreign policy and security studies at Malaysia's Institute of Strategic and International Studies said: "One platform that Datuk Seri Najib (Anwar Ibrahim) will likely continue to champion is his Global Movement of Moderates. He may look to partner more closely with the US on that platform to fight extremism." Director of the Politicon Center for Strategic Researches and Political Consultations in Moldova Anatol Taranu said that he expects a new Obama administrations would not have radical changes and should be a stabilizing factor for Moldova–United States relations and Moldova would continue receiving financial assistance from the U.S.

Italian analysts suggested Obama could help ease the European sovereign debt crisis in his second term. Il Sole 24 Ore's political analyst Stefano Folli said: "This is yet another reason for Italy to feel close to the reconfirmed leader [as the United States and Europe know they] either stand together or fall together." Nomisma research institute's Alessandro Politi agreed that the Eurozone's future depends on systemically managing dialogue with the United States to coordinate the differing economic policies of each of its member states. "We need to stop losing time on personal interests. Obama's re-election gives Europe one more opportunity to help itself and to fix the crisis, but the single currency region has to grasp it with firmer belief." The London-based Royal United Services Institute's analyst Shashank Joshi also said: "With the re-election of Obama, what you have is a strong confidence on the British side that the U.S. administration will be engaged more on Syria from the get-go."

See also

Foreign policy of the Barack Obama administration

References

2012 in international relations
International reactions
2012 in the United States
International reactions to elections
Reactions to 2010s events